Ronald Everett Tompkins (November 27, 1944 – February 4, 2023) was an American professional baseball pitcher. He played in Major League Baseball (MLB) for the Kansas City Athletics (1965) and Chicago Cubs (1971).

Tompkins never won a big-league game in his career. Today, he is perhaps best known for appearing on a Topps 1968 "Rookie Stars" baseball card with Hall of Fame catcher Johnny Bench–– a high profile card based on the fact that it is Bench's rookie card.

References

External links

1944 births
2023 deaths
Águilas del Zulia players
Baseball players from San Diego
Binghamton Triplets players
Birmingham Barons players
Cardenales de Lara players
Chicago Cubs players
Daytona Beach Islanders players
Florida Instructional League Athletics players
Indianapolis Indians players
Lewiston Broncs players
Kansas City Athletics players
Major League Baseball pitchers
Navegantes del Magallanes players
American expatriate baseball players in Venezuela
Portland Beavers players
Richmond Braves players
Vancouver Mounties players
Wichita Aeros players